Siliqua is a comune (municipality) in the Province of South Sardinia in the island of Sardinia, located about  northwest of Cagliari.

Main sights
Castle of Acquafredda (13th century), commanding the valley of the Cixerri river. It was built by count Ugolino della Gherardesca, and was later held by the Aragonese and other Sardinian feudataries.
Several Domus de janas
Natural reserve of Monte Arcosu

See also
Campidano
Sulcis

References

External links

 Official website

Cities and towns in Sardinia